Vanessa Frances Hall-Smith MBE was the director of the British Institute of Florence from 2004 to 2011.

Hall-Smith came from a family of doctors.  She attended Roedean School, lived in Italy where she attended the University of Perugia, later studying law at the University of Exeter and conducted postgraduate studies in Germany and France. At Exeter, Hall-Smith played viola and violin and recorded an album with a progressive rock band Fuchsia.

She passed the English bar exam in 1976 and practised as a barrister for a number of years. She later requalified as a solicitor and was a partner with the London firms The Simkins Partnership and Harrison Curtis, specialising in advertising rights. She spoke publicly on copyright issues; specifically on copyrighted media used in advertising and the associated risks for the advertisers and state regulation of the industry.

In 2008 Hall-Smith became a Member of the Order of the British Empire "for services promoting UK culture in Italy."

References

Year of birth missing (living people)
Living people
Alumni of the University of Edinburgh
English barristers
English solicitors
Members of the Order of the British Empire
People educated at Roedean School, East Sussex
University of Perugia alumni
British women lawyers